Christella Josette Garcia (born November 21, 1978) is a judo athlete and Paralympian who competed in two Paralympics, in 2012 and 2016. She won the bronze metal in Rio, Brazil, in 2016 in the 70 kg weight class.

References

External links 
 
 
 
 

1978 births
Living people
American female judoka
Paralympic judoka of the United States
Paralympic bronze medalists for the United States
Paralympic medalists in judo
Judoka at the 2012 Summer Paralympics
Judoka at the 2016 Summer Paralympics
Medalists at the 2016 Summer Paralympics
Place of birth missing (living people)
Medalists at the 2019 Parapan American Games
21st-century American women